Gillian Keegan (born 13 March 1968) is a British politician serving as Secretary of State for Education. A member of the Conservative Party, she previously served as Minister of State for Care and Mental Health from 2021 to 2022 and Parliamentary Under-Secretary of State for Africa in 2022. She has been Member of Parliament (MP) for Chichester since 2017.

Keegan grew up in Huyton, Liverpool City Region. She studied at Liverpool John Moores University and London Business School. She held senior positions in various business sectors, including as chief marketing officer for Travelport.

Keegan was a councillor on Chichester District Council from 2014 to 2018. She was elected to Parliament for Chichester at the 2017 general election. She was appointed Parliamentary Under-Secretary of State for Apprenticeships and Skills in February 2020 during the second Johnson ministry. In the 2021 cabinet reshuffle she was promoted to Minister of State for Care and Mental Health.

In 2022, she was appointed Secretary of State for Education by Prime Minister Rishi Sunak.

Early life
Keegan (née Gibson) was born in Leigh, Lancashire, to an office manager father and a mother who did secretarial work. She went to primary school in Yorkshire. She grew up in Knowsley, Merseyside, and went to St Augustine of Canterbury Secondary School in Huyton. She was the only pupil to get 10 O-Levels at her school. She has a bachelor's degree in Business Studies from Liverpool John Moores University and a Master of Science in Strategy and Leadership (Sloan Fellowship) from London Business School in 2011.

Professional career
Keegan started her career aged 16 as an apprentice at a car factory in Kirkby and went on to have a business career working at Delco Electronics (part of the General Motors Group), NatWest Bank (senior buyer), MasterCard International (commercial director), Amadeus IT Group (group vice president of Multinational Customer Group based in Madrid) and Travelport (chief marketing officer) for over 27 years.

Political career
Keegan has said that it was her experiences of trade unionism and the Militant-controlled Liverpool City Council while working in Kirkby in her youth during the 1980s that convinced her to support the Conservative Party. However, she did not become active in politics until 2014. In 2015, she was advised in her ambitions to become an MP by Justine Greening, whom she met by chance at a London Business School (LBS) reunion; according to her, this demonstrated the power of the LBS network. 

Keegan's father-in-law was the late Conservative MP, Denis Keegan. She unsuccessfully contested the constituency of St Helens South and Whiston at the 2015 general election. In 2015 she became director of Women2Winan organisation founded by Theresa May and Anne Jenkin, Baroness Jenkin of Kennington in 2005 to help elect more women Conservative MPs to Parliament. She had left that position by September 2017.

Keegan was elected as a councillor for the Rogate ward on Chichester District Council in 2014. She was appointed cabinet member for commercial services in May 2015. She stood down as a councillor in February 2018 and in the election that followed in April 2018, the seat was taken by the Liberal Democrat candidate Kate O'Kelly. Keegan went on to beat O'Kelly by 21,490 votes at the 2019 general election.

Keegan was selected as the Conservative Parliamentary candidate for Chichester in May 2017, and was elected to the House of Commons at the 2017 general election. She is the constituency's first female MP. In September 2017, she was appointed to the Public Accounts Committee.

In February 2019, Keegan was appointed as MP Apprenticeship Ambassador by Anne Milton, with responsibility to support apprenticeship schemes and promote them both within Parliament and to businesses within the UK, working alongside the Apprenticeship Ambassador Network consisting of various advocates of apprenticeship schemes.

Government
Keegan was appointed Parliamentary Private Secretary (PPS) to HM Treasury in September 2018. In January 2019, she became PPS to the secretary of state for defence. Keegan became PPS to the home secretary in May 2019. Keegan endorsed Rory Stewart during the 2019 Conservative Party leadership election. She became PPS to the Secretary of State for Health and Social Care in September 2019.

In February 2020, she was appointed Parliamentary Under-Secretary of State for Apprenticeships and Skills, a junior ministerial role at the Department for Education, and was the first former apprentice to hold the office. 

In August 2020, Keegan was criticised for being on holiday during the GCSE and A-Level grading controversy. She defended herself by stating that she was not the minister responsible for A-Level and GCSE qualifications. She said that although she had been the duty minister for the first two weeks of summer recess, she had obtained special permission to take her government computer with her to continue working during this period.

In the September 2021 reshuffle, Keegan was appointed Minister of State for Care and Mental Health. During the July 2022 United Kingdom government crisis, Keegan did not respond to a press enquiry by the Chichester Observer to comment on her decision not to resign. Following the announcement by Boris Johnson that he intended to resign as party leader, Keegan released a statement in which she praised the prime minister's leadership and announced that she would remain a minister in his government.

Keegan endorsed Rishi Sunak in the July–September 2022 Conservative Party leadership election and was subsequently demoted when Liz Truss became Prime Minister in September 2022, serving as Parliamentary Under-Secretary of State for Africa. Keegan endorsed Sunak again in the October 2022 Conservative Party leadership election and was appointed Secretary of State for Education. She was sworn as a member of the Privy Council on 27 October 2022.

On 5 January 2023, Keegan represented the British government at the funeral of Pope Benedict XVI.

Personal life
Keegan lives in Petworth in West Sussex with her second husband, Michael, and has two stepsons.

Michael Keegan is currently employed as a crown representative to the Cabinet Office, managing cross-government relationships with BAE Systems as a strategic supplier to the Government. His role became the subject of media attention in 2022, when it was highlighted that the MoD had awarded £24 million in contracts to Centerprise International, an IT company on which he has sat as a non-executive director. A spokesperson for the Civil Service dismissed these claims, stating Michael Keegan did not have an active role in procurement.

Keegan's father-in-law, Denis Keegan, was Conservative MP for Nottingham South. Keegan and her husband jointly own a flat in London, as well as a property in France.

Notes

References

External links

1968 births
Living people
21st-century British women politicians
Alumni of Liverpool John Moores University
British Secretaries of State for Education
Conservative Party (UK) MPs for English constituencies
Female members of the Parliament of the United Kingdom for English constituencies
London Business School Sloan Fellows
People from Knowsley, Merseyside
People from Petworth
UK MPs 2017–2019
UK MPs 2019–present
21st-century English women
21st-century English people
Members of the Privy Council of the United Kingdom